Katalin Zöldi-Tóth (born 25 June 1984 in Sátoraljaújhely) is a Hungarian handballer who plays for Békéscsabai Előre NKSE and the Hungarian national team.

She made her international debut on 6 June 2009 against Slovakia.

Achievements
Magyar Kupa:
Silver Medalist: 2012
Bronze Medalist: 2010
EHF Cup:
Winner: 2005

References

External links
 Katalin Tóth player profile on Békéscsabai Előre NKSE Official Website
 Katalin Tóth career statistics at Worldhandball

1984 births
Living people
People from Sátoraljaújhely
Hungarian female handball players
Békéscsabai Előre NKSE players
Sportspeople from Borsod-Abaúj-Zemplén County